Pětipsy is a municipality and village in Chomutov District in the Ústí nad Labem Region of the Czech Republic. It has about 200 inhabitants.

Administrative parts
The village of Vidolice is an administrative part of Pětipsy.

References

Villages in Chomutov District